Ivana Tufegdžić (born February 11, 1993) is a Macedonian politician who serves as a Member of Parliament in the Assembly of North Macedonia.

Biography
Born in Skopje on February 11, 1993, Tufegdžić graduated from Gimnazija "Orce Nikolov" in Skopje before enrolling at University of Skopje's Faculty of Law, where she graduated with a degree in political science. As a student at the University of Skopje, Tufegdžić served on the Student Council, negotiating with Ministry of Education officials around a new higher education law. During the Colorful Revolution Tufegdžić, with her colleague Pavle Bogoevski, organized several protests against the government.

In the 2016 Macedonian parliamentary election, Tufegdžić was elected as a member of the Social Democratic Union of Macedonia in the First Constituency, where the party won ten seats.

In Parliament, Tufegdžić has been active on youth-related issues, specifically around youth emigration from North Macedonia.

References

1993 births
Living people
Members of the Assembly of North Macedonia
Social Democratic Union of Macedonia politicians